A Double-Dyed Deceiver is a lost 1920 American silent crime-drama film directed by Alfred E. Green and starring Jack Pickford. It was produced and distributed by the Goldwyn Pictures company.

Plot
As described in a film magazine, The Llano Kid (Pickford), after killing a Mexican in Texas, flees to Buennas Tierras, South America. The American counsel, seeking to rob an aristocratic Spanish family whose son disappeared years ago, schemes to use the Kid as a fence by having him pose as the lost son. The Kid is received royally by the family and for the first time he experiences love. Transformed through the experience of motherly love, the Kid rebels and he refuses to rob his benefactors. Instead, he falls in love with a relative and stays with the family.

Cast
Jack Pickford as The Llano Kid
Marie Dunn as Estella
James Neill as Senor Urique
Edythe Chapman as Senora Urique
Sidney Ainsworth as Thacker
Manuel R. Ojeda as Secretary

References

External links

Poster

1920 films
American silent feature films
Lost American films
Films directed by Alfred E. Green
Goldwyn Pictures films
Films based on short fiction
Adaptations of works by O. Henry
American black-and-white films
1920s American films
Silent American drama films
Silent crime drama films
American crime drama films
1920s English-language films